Lindsey Verrill (born March 13, 1982) is an American avant-garde multi-instrumentalist from Dallas, Texas who currently lives in Austin, Texas.

Music career 
Largely self-taught on cello and upright bass before studying music at the University of North Texas in Denton, Verrill became a key component across a number of indie bands in Austin as well as a founding member of the Austin-based Annie Street Arts Collective. She has performed with Ethan Azarian, Califone, Dana Falconberry, Patty Griffin, Thor Harris,  Will Johnson, Longriver, Possessed by Paul James, some say Leland, Charlie Sexton, the Weird Weeds, and Ralph White. In 2017, she traveled to Germany, France, Japan, and Canada as a part of the ATX6.

In 2015, she began performing her own material seriously as part of the experimental folk duo Little Mazarn with Jeff Johnson featuring unusual instrumentation of banjo and musical saw. Verrill and Johnston started Little Mazarn performing at the iconic Austin venue Hole in the Wall, a known haunt of Austin figures such as Townes Van Zandt and Blaze Foley. Both Verrill and Johnston had been playing bass in bands, most notably with Austin musicians Dana Falconberry Lil’ Cap’n Travis, Bill Callahan and others. Little Mazarn was a band where neither of them wanted to play the bass on stage. Little Mazarn was named after a river in northwest Arkansas.

In 2019, Little Mazarn followed up their 2017 self titled EP with their first full length album, Io, a work of folk minimalism including a melancholy reinterpretation of Dancing in the Dark by Bruce Springsteen. The album mainly featured banjo and saw with contributions from guest vocalists Will Johnson and Kendra Kinsey as well as instrumental contributions from Thor Harris and Ralph White.

In 2022, Little Mazarn released their second album ‘Texas River Song’ on Dear Life Records, a so called ‘Geographic love letter’ to Texas, written in 2020 after the pandemic put a complete stop to touring and traveling. 
.

Discography

 "Texas River Song" Album by Little Mazarn with special guests Thor Harris,Tim Rutili (Dear Life Records) 2022
 "Werewolf" Single by Little Mazarn with special guests Thor Harris, Craig Ross, Jad Fair (Kill Rock Stars) 2021
 3 & 4 by Thor & Friends (Joyful Noise Recordings)
 2 Songs by the Andrew Weathers Ensemble (Timesuck) 2020
 As We Go Wandering by Possessed by Paul James 2020
 El Capitan by Will Johnson (Keeled Scales) 2020 
 Patty Griffin by Patty Griffin (Thirty Tigers) 2019
 Io by Little Mazarn 2019
 Wire Mountain by Will Johnson (Keeled Scales) 2019
 Of Seasons by Longriver 2019
 Little Mazarn by Little Mazarn (Self Sabotage Records) 2017
 From the Forest Came the Fire by Dana Falconberry (Modern Outsider) 2016
 Bay of Seething by Moonsicles (Feeding Tube Records) 2016
 Ralph White and Little Mazarn with Ralph White 2015
 Servant of Love by Patty Griffin (Thirty Tigers) 2015
 Creeper by Moonsicles 2014
 Brought Low by Some Say Leland  2014
 Leelanau by Dana Falconberry (Antenna Farm) 2012
 The Weird Weeds by the Weird Weeds (Sedimental) 2012
 Help Me Name Melody by the Weird Weeds (Autobus) 2010

References

External links
 Little Mazarn Official Site

1982 births
Living people
American cellists
American banjoists
Musicians from Texas
Songwriters from Texas
American bass guitarists
Musicians from Austin, Texas